Lyne Kirk is an ancient and historic kirk or church, of the Church of Scotland. It is situated on top of a mound adjacent to the A72 trunk route 4.5 miles west of Peebles in the ancient county of Peeblesshire, now in the Scottish Borders area, and governed by the Scottish Borders Council.

Pre-Reformation
The church was founded in the 12th century, in the reign of William the Lion, as the Chapel of Lyne in the dependency of the nearby Stobo Kirk, and overseen by the Bishopric of Glasgow. While still part of the diocese of Glasgow, Lyne became a parish in its own right in the 14th century. Reverend Hew Scott, author of the Fasti Ecclesiae Scoticanae remarked in that publication that he believed Lyne was the cradle of Christianity in Peeblesshire.

Post Reformation ministers, 1560-1682
 Patrick Grinton     1560–1571
 Gilbert Hay         1575–1592
 John Ker            1593–1627
 Hew Ker             1627–1658 (son of the above named John)
 Robert Brown        1659–1682

The later years

Towards the end of the Bishopric of Glasgow, Lyne Kirk was falling into disrepair and, in 1600, was described as ruinous. In 1644, the church was greatly renovated and refurbished to form the fine building seen today. The renovations were carried out by John Hay, 8th Lord Yester. In 1889, Francis Charteris, Earl of Wemyss carried out further major renewal work on the church.
John Hay was later elevated to the earldom of Tweeddale.
The interior of the church is mainly 17th century with a pre-Reformation font and a new porch was added in the 19th century. The kirkyard contains many fine gravestones including the beautiful "Adam and Eve" gravestone, from 1712, depicting the temptation, by Lucifer, to eat the fruit of the tree of knowledge.

Lyne Kirk is open to visitors.

See also
Lyne Water
Lyne
Lyne Viaduct
List of places in the Scottish Borders

References

External links

More photographs at Lyne

Churches in the Scottish Borders
Listed churches in Scotland
Category B listed buildings in the Scottish Borders